William Albert McClung (May 9, 1930July 28, 2002) was a professional American football offensive lineman in the National Football League. He played seven seasons for the Pittsburgh Steelers (1955–1957), the Cleveland Browns (1958–1959), the Detroit Lions (1960–1961) and the Hamilton Tiger Cats (1962).

References

1930 births
2002 deaths
People from Marion, Alabama
Players of American football from Alabama
American football offensive tackles
American football defensive tackles
Florida A&M Rattlers football players
Pittsburgh Steelers players
Cleveland Browns players
Detroit Lions players